The 2018 North Hertfordshire Council election was held on 3 May 2018, at the same time as other local elections across England. Of the 49 seats on North Hertfordshire District Council, 19 were up for election, being the usual third of the council plus a by-election in Letchworth Grange ward.

The Conservatives lost five seats at the election, three to the Liberal Democrats and two to Labour, but retained their majority on the council, with Conservative leader Lynda Needham continuing to serve as leader of the council. The Labour group leader prior to the election was Frank Radcliffe, but he did not stand for re-election and was replaced after the election by Martin Stears-Handscomb.

Overall results
The overall results were as follows:

Ward results
The results for each ward were as follows. Where the previous incumbent was standing for re-election they are marked with an asterisk(*). A double dagger(‡) indicates a sitting councillor contesting a different ward.

The by-election in Letchworth Grange ward was triggered by the resignation of Labour councillor Clare Billing in order to contest Hitchin Oughton ward instead.

Changes 2018–2019
Paul Marment, elected in 2015 as a Conservative councillor for Letchworth Grange ward, defected to the Liberal Democrats in August 2018.

References 

North Hertfordshire District Council election
May 2018 events in the United Kingdom
2019
2010s in Hertfordshire
Election and referendum articles with incomplete results